The 2001 New York City Marathon was the 32nd running of the annual marathon race in New York City, United States, which took place on Sunday, November 3. The men's elite race was won by Ethiopia's Tesfaye Jifar in a time of 2:07:43 hours while the women's race was won in 2:24:21 by Kenya's Margaret Okayo. Both these times were race records. Tesfaye Jifar was the first Ethiopian to win in New York and Okayo was the second Kenyan to win the women's race (after Tegla Loroupe).

In the wheelchair races, America's Saúl Mendoza (1:39:25) and Italy's Francesca Porcellato (2:11:57) won the men's and women's divisions, respectively. In the handcycle race, Israel's Ziv Bar-Shira (1:27:49) and America's Helene Hines (1:46:22) were the winners.

A total of 23,648 runners finished the race, 16,810 men and 6838 women.

The race was held in the wake of the September 11 attacks, thus the course was altered and mass participation was significantly down on previous years. Around 2800 police officers were present to ensure security, a no-fly zone was instituted above the race route, and runners were discouraged from accepting water from spectators on the route. The race adopted the slogan "United We Run" and the city's mayor, Rudy Giuliani, was given the number 1 bib, which is typically reserved for the men's defending champion.

Results

Men

Women

Wheelchair men

Wheelchair women

Handcycle men

Handcycle women

References

Results
2001 New York Marathon Results. New York Road Runners. Retrieved 2020-05-21.
Results. Association of Road Racing Statisticians. Retrieved 2020-05-21.

External links
New York Road Runners website

2001
New York City
Marathon
New York City Marathon